Sahl ibn Ḥunayf was one of the Companions of the Islamic prophet Muhammad. He is said to have narrated about forty hadiths from Muhammad.

When Muhammad's cousin Ali ibn Abi Talib arrived in Medina after the migration from Mecca in 622, Muhammad established fraternal ties between Ali and Sahl ibn Hunayf.

References

Sahabah hadith narrators
Rashidun governors of Medina
Rashidun governors of Fars